Kuhpayeh County is in Isfahan province, Iran. The capital of the county is the city of Tudeshk. At the 2006 census, the region's population (as Kuhpayeh District of Isfahan County) was 21,760 in 6,428 households. The following census in 2011 counted 22,275 people in 6,989 households. At the 2016 census, the district's population was 23,676 in 7,858 households. The district was separated from Isfahan County in 2021 to become Kuhpayeh County.

Administrative divisions

The population history of Kuhpayeh County's administrative divisions (as Kuhpayeh District of Isfahan County) over three consecutive censuses is shown in the following table.

References

Counties of Isfahan Province

fa:شهرستان کوهپایه